Leopold Scholz (1877–1946)  Austrian born American sculptor best known for his works in the National Statuary Hall Collection housed in the  US Capitol in Washington D.C.

In 1921 Scholz married sculptor Belle Kinney Scholz and much of his best known work was executed with her.

IN 1938 Scholz created a statue for the United States post office in Chattanooga, Tennessee. The statue, a bust from the waist up, portrays a postman dressing in the 1930s uniform, with a look of determination  on his face that reminds us that the mail will be delivered no matter what the obstacles might be."

Work

 Andrew Jackson statue, National Statuary Hall Collection, U.S. Capitol, Washington D.C., with Belle Kinney  1927
 John Sevier statue, National Statuary Hall Collection, U.S. Capitol, with Belle Kinney, 1931
 Bronx Victory statue, Bronx Victory Column & Memorial Grove World War I Memorial in Pelham Bay Park, New York City, with Belle Kinney, 1933
 Victory statue, War Memorial Auditorium, Legislative Plaza, Nashville, with Belle Kinney, 1929
 Pediment sculptures of the Nashville Parthenon, with Belle Kinney, 1920-30
 Postman, Chattanooga Post Office, Chattanooga, Tennessee, 1938
  A Pioneer Woman's Bravery'', a cast stone bas relief, WPA project for the USPO, Angola, New York, 1940

References

1877 births
1946 deaths
20th-century American sculptors
20th-century American male artists
American male sculptors

Section of Painting and Sculpture artists
Austrian emigrants to the United States